List of Kuge families include the high level bureaucrats and nobles (kuge) in the Japanese Imperial court. This list is based on the lineage of the family (the clan from which the family derives, such as the Fujiwara, Minamoto, or Taira) and the kakaku (rank). The kuge along with the daimyō made up the nobility (kazoku) of post-Meiji Restoration Japan. The kazoku was abolished shortly after World War II.

Fujiwara clan 
Originally, the Fujiwara four families (藤原四家) were branches established by the four sons of Fujiwara no Fuhito: Nanke, Hokke, Shikike, and Kyōke. Hokke later became the most successful out of the four families, and there are five main branches from Hokke, known as the Sekke, otherwise known as Five regent houses:

Ichijō
Konoe 
Kujō
Nijō
Takatsukasa

And other cadet branches of Fujiwara, becoming one of Kuge, include:

Seigake
Daigo 醍醐家
Imadegawa (renamed Kikutei)　今出川（菊亭）家
Kasannoin 花山院家
Ōinomikado　大炊御門家
Saionji　西園寺家
Sanjō　三條家
Tokudaiji　德大寺家

Daijinke
Sanjōnishi　三條西家
Ōgimachinosanjō (renamed Saga) 正親町三條（嵯峨）家
Nakanoin　中院家

Urinke
Aburanokōji　油小路家
Anegakōji　姉小路家
Ano　阿野家
Asukai　飛鳥井家
Fujitani　藤谷家
Hachijō　八條家
Hanazono　花園家
Hashimoto　橋本家
Higashizono　東園家
Higuchi　樋口家
Hinonishi　日野西家
Horikawa　堀河家
Imaki　今城家
Irie　入江家
Ishiyama　石山家
Iwano　石野家
Jimyōin　持明院家
Kawabata　河鰭家
Kazahaya　風早家
Kushige　櫛笥家
Machijiri　町尻家
Matsunaga 松永家
Matsunoki　松木家
Mibu　壬生家
Minase　水無瀬家
Mushanokōji　武者小路家
Nakayama　中山家
Nakazono　中園家
Nanba　難波家
Nishiōji　西大路家
Nishiyotsutsuji　西四辻家
Nonomiya　野宮家
Ōgimachi　正親町家
Ogura　小倉家
Omiya　大宮家
Oshikōji　押小路家
Reizei (Reizen, Kaminoreizei)　冷泉家
Rokkaku　六角家
Sakurai　櫻井家
Shichijō family　七條家
Shigenoi　滋野井家
Shijō　四條家
Shimizudani  清水谷家　
Shimonoreizei  下冷泉家
Sono　園家
Sonoike　園池家
Takamatsu　高松家
Takano　高野家
Takaoka　高丘家
Umezono　梅園家
Uratsuji　裏辻家
Washio　鷲尾家　
Yabu　藪家
Yamamoto　山本家
Yamanoi　山井家
Yamashina　山科家
Yotsutsuji　四辻家

Meika
Bōjō family　坊城家
Hamuro　葉室家
Hino　日野家
Hinonishi　日野西家
Hirohashi　廣橋家
Honami　穂波家
Ikegami　池尻家
Kadenokōji 勘解由小路家
Kajūji 勧修寺家
Kanroji　甘露寺家
Karasumaru　烏丸家
Kitanokōji　北小路家
Madenokōji　万里小路家
Mimurodo　三室戸家
Nakamikado　中御門家
Okazaki　岡崎家
Seikanji　清閑寺家
Shibayama　芝山家
Takeya　竹屋家
Toyama　外山家
Toyooka　豊岡家
Tsutsumi　堤家
Umenokōji　梅小路家
Uramatsu　裏松家
Yanagiwara　柳原家

Hanke
Karahashi　唐橋家
Shirakawa　白川家
Takakura　高倉家　
Tominokōji　富小路家　
Nishikikōji　錦小路家

Minamoto clan (Genji)

Seigake
Hirohata　廣幡家
Koga　久我家

Daijinke
Nakanoin　中院家

Urinke
Ayanokōji　綾小路家
Chigusa　千種家
Higashikuze　東久世家
Iwakura　岩倉家
Kuze　久世家
Niwata　庭田家
Ōhara　大原家
Otagi　愛宕家
Rokujō　六條家
Uematsu　植松家
Umedani　梅溪家

Hanke
Itsutsuji　五辻家
Jikōji　慈光寺家
Takenouchi　竹内家

Taira clan (Heishi)

Meika
Hiramatsu　平松家
Katano　交野家
Nagatani　長谷家

Hanke
Iwai　石井家
Nishinotōin　西洞院家

Others

Hanke
Fujii 藤井家 (from Urabe clan)
Fujinami 藤波家 (from Ōnakatomi clan)
Fushihara　伏原家 (from Kiyohara clan)
Funahashi　船橋家 (from Kiyohara clan)
Gojō　五條家 (from Sugawara clan)
Hagiwara　萩原家 (from Urabe clan)
Higashibōjō　東坊城家 (from Sugawara clan)
Karahashi　唐橋家 (from Sugawara clan)
Kitanokoji　北小路家 (from Oe clan)
Kiyooka　清岡家 (from Sugawara clan)
Kurahashi　倉橋家 (from Abe clan)
Kuwabara　桑原家 (from Sugawara clan)
Nishigori　錦織家 (from Urabe clan)
Sawa　澤家 (from Kiyohara clan)
Takatsuji　高辻家 (from Sugawara clan)
Tsuchimikado　土御門家 (from Abe clan)
Yoshida　吉田家 (from Urabe clan)

See also
 Japanese clans

References 

 
Kuge